Gran Hermano Dúo is the latest spin-off of the Spanish reality television Gran Hermano series. The first season was launched in January 2019 on Telecinco. Jorge Javier Vázquez is the host of this version of the show. Jordi González came back as the host of the weekly Debate. The format is that housemates will be entering in the house with a current or former relationship.

Housemates 
The first official housemates of the season, Kiko Rivera and Irene Rosales, were announced on 20 December 2018, during the finale of Gran Hermano VIP 6. The rest of the housemates were confirmed days later and, some of them, during the first program of the season.

Nominations table

Notes

Nominations total received

Debate: Blind results

Repechage 
The first 6 evicted housemates would face an online voting that will decide which 3 of them will return to the house as candidates to officially become as official housemates.

The repechage was officially announced on Day 45 (February 21, 2019). All the evicted housemates (Fede, Yurena, Candela, Sofía, Fortu and Yoli) faced the voting. The 3 most voted housemates entered the house on Day 48, while Fede was the housemate with fewest votes on Day 50 and Sofía was the most voted and became an official housemate on Day 52, therefore Candela was re-evicted.

Ratings

"Galas"

"Debates"

"Límite 48H" / "Límite 24H"

References

External links
 Official site on Telecinco.es
 Gran Hermano Main Site

Gran Hermano (Spanish TV series)
Telecinco original programming
2019 Spanish television seasons